Harry Scott (27 October 1937 – 16 December 2015) was a British boxer and contender in the middleweight division during the 1960s.

Scott started off as an amateur winning the bronze medal at the 1959 European Boxing Championships in Lucerne.

Scott turned professional in 1960.

He never fought for the British title, losing three final eliminators. Yet his ability was widely recognised, and he fought around the world, facing four past or future world champions, including Emile Griffith and Alan Minter.

But he is best known for his two contests in 1965 at the Royal Albert Hall against Rubin "Hurricane" Carter, who had fought for the world title the previous December. In their first meeting in March, Carter was awarded the victory on cuts in the ninth round despite trailing on points, only to be outpointed six weeks later, in what Boxing News declared to be one of the finest victories by a British boxer in the previous 20 years.

ITV made a documentary about Scott called "Come Out Fighting" in 1967. It included segments of Scott's family life and his boxing career.

Scott retired in 1973.

Following Scott's retirement he went on to be a Green Grocer. Scott had two children.

Professional boxing record

|-
|align="center" colspan=8|39 Wins (20 knockouts, 19 decisions), 34 Losses (5 knockout, 29 decisions), 6 Draw

|-
| align="center" style="border-style: none none solid solid; background: #e3e3e3"|Result
| align="center" style="border-style: none none solid solid; background: #e3e3e3"|Record
| align="center" style="border-style: none none solid solid; background: #e3e3e3"|Opponent
| align="center" style="border-style: none none solid solid; background: #e3e3e3"|Type
| align="center" style="border-style: none none solid solid; background: #e3e3e3"|Round
| align="center" style="border-style: none none solid solid; background: #e3e3e3"|Date
| align="center" style="border-style: none none solid solid; background: #e3e3e3"|Location
| align="center" style="border-style: none none solid solid; background: #e3e3e3"|Notes
|-align=center
|Loss
|
|align=left| Trevor Francis
|TKO
|7
|13 Jun 1973
|align=left| Wolverhampton Civic Hall, Wolverhampton, West Midlands, United Kingdom
|align=left|
|-
|Loss
|
|align=left| Alan Minter
|PTS
|8
|13 Mar 1973
|align=left| Empire Pool, Wembley, London, United Kingdom
|align=left|
|-
|Loss
|
|align=left| Maxie Smith
|TKO
|5
|24 Jan 1973
|align=left| Trentham Gardens, Stoke-on-Trent, Staffordshire, United Kingdom
|align=left|
|-
|Loss
|
|align=left| Jan Kies
|PTS
|10
|10 Jun 1972
|align=left| Portuguese Hall, Johannesburg, Gauteng, South Africa
|align=left|
|-
|Win
|
|align=left| Cyclone Barth
|PTS
|8
|24 Apr 1972
|align=left| Sporting Club, Bedford, Bedfordshire, United Kingdom
|align=left|
|-
|Loss
|
|align=left| Eric Blake
|PTS
|8
|9 Mar 1972
|align=left| Cliffs Pavilion, Southend, Essex, United Kingdom
|align=left|
|-
|Loss
|
|align=left| Kevin Finnegan
|PTS
|10
|15 Feb 1972
|align=left| Royal Albert Hall, Kensington, London, United Kingdom
|align=left|
|-
|Loss
|
|align=left| Matt Donovan
|PTS
|8
|20 Dec 1971
|align=left| Palais des Sports, Paris, France
|align=left|
|-
|Won
|
|align=left| Eric Blake
|PTS
|8
|5 Oct 1971
|align=left| Royal Albert Hall, Kensington, London, United Kingdom
|align=left|
|-
|Won
|
|align=left| William Poitrimol
|PTS
|8
|18 May 1971
|align=left| Liverpool, Merseyside, United Kingdom
|align=left|
|-
|Won
|
|align=left| Dick Duffy
|PTS
|8
|5 Apr 1971
|align=left| National Sporting Club, Piccadilly, London, United Kingdom
|align=left|
|-
|Draw
|
|align=left| Teddy Meho
|PTS
|8
|22 Mar 1971
|align=left| Bloomsbury, London, United Kingdom
|align=left|
|-
|Won
|
|align=left| Clarence Cassius
|PTS
|8
|2 Feb 1971
|align=left| Streatham, London, United Kingdom
|align=left|
|-
|Loss
|
|align=left| Tom Jensen
|PTS
|8
|8 Oct 1970
|align=left| K.B. Hallen, Copenhagen, Denmark
|align=left|
|-
|Loss
|
|align=left| Pierre Fourie
|PTS
|10
|11 Jul 1970
|align=left| Wembley Ice Rink, Johannesburg, Gauteng, South Africa
|align=left|
|-
|Loss
|
|align=left| Bunny Sterling
|PTS
|12
|11 May 1970
|align=left| Nottingham, Nottinghamshire, United Kingdom
|align=left|
|-
|Loss
|
|align=left| Sandro Mazzinghi
|PTS
|10
|18 Apr 1970
|align=left| Palazzetto dello Sport, Bologna, Italy
|align=left|
|-
|Win
|
|align=left| Carl Thomas
|TKO
|9
|9 Mar 1970
|align=left| Center Hotel, London, United Kingdom
|align=left|
|-
|Loss
|
|align=left|  Chris Finnegan
|PTS
|10
|8 Dec 1969
|align=left| Anglo-American Sporting Club, Mayfair, London, United Kingdom
|align=left|
|-
|Win
|
|align=left| Henry Turkington
|TKO
|1
|6 Oct 1969
|align=left| Premier Sporting Club, Kensington, London, United Kingdom
|align=left|
|-
|Win
|
|align=left| Bunny Sterling
|PTS
|8
|24 Apr 1969
|align=left| Royal Garden Hotel, Kensington, London, United Kingdom
|align=left|
|-
|Won
|
|align=left| Tom Jensen
|PTS
|6
|6 Mar 1969
|align=left| K.B. Hallen, Copenhagen, Denmark
|align=left|
|-
|Win
|
|align=left| Tommy Bell
|PTS
|8
|11 Nov 1968
|align=left| Colston Hall, Bristol, United Kingdom
|align=left|
|-
|Loss
|
|align=left| Les McAteer
|PTS
|12
|17 Sep 1968
|align=left| The Stadium, Liverpool, Merseyside, United Kingdom
|align=left|
|-
|Won
|
|align=left| Clarence Cassius
|TKO
|4
|26 May 1968
|align=left| Hilton Hotel, Mayfair, London, United Kingdom
|align=left|
|-
|Win
|
|align=left| Bill Robinson
|TKO
|7
|18 Apr 1968
|align=left| Manor Place Baths, Walworth, London, United Kingdom
|align=left|
|-
|Draw
|
|align=left| Johnny Kramer
|PTS
|8
|12 Dec 1967
|align=left| Civic Hall, Wolverhampton, West Midlands, United Kingdom
|align=left|
|-
|Win
|
|align=left| Larry Brown
|TKO
|1
|22 Aug 1967
|align=left| Civic Hall, Wolverhampton, West Midlands, United Kingdom
|align=left|
|-
|Win
|
|align=left| Ruben Orrico
|PTS
|10
|11 Jul 1967
|align=left| The Stadium, Liverpool, Merseyside, United Kingdom
|align=left|
|-
|Loss
|
|align=left| Tom Bogs
|PTS
|10
|6 Apr 1967
|align=left| K.B. Hallen, Copenhagen, Denmark
|align=left|
|-
|Loss
|
|align=left| Henry Turkington
|PTS
|8
|4 Mar 1967
|align=left| Ulster Hall, Belfast, Northern Ireland, United Kingdom
|align=left|
|-
|Loss
|
|align=left| Juan Carlos Duran
|PTS
|10
|3 Feb 1967
|align=left| Palazzetto dello Sport, Bologna, Italy
|align=left|
|-
|Win
|
|align=left| Johnny Hendrickson
|PTS
|8
|18 Jan 1967
|align=left| Grosvenor House, Mayfair, London, United Kingdom
|align=left|
|-

|Loss
|
|align=left| Nino Benvenuti
|PTS
|10
|23 Sep 1966
|align=left| Palazzetto dello Sport, Bologna, Italy
|align=left|
|-

|Win
|
|align=left| Sugar Boy Nando
|PTS
|10
|18 Mar 1966
|align=left| Masshallen, Gothenburg, Sweden
|align=left|
|-

|Loss
|
|align=left| Willie Hart
|PTS
|10
|1 Nov 1965
|align=left| Free Trade Hall, Manchester, United Kingdom
|align=left|
|-

|Loss
|
|align=left| Emile Griffith
|RTD
|7
|4 Oct 1965
|align=left| Royal Albert Hall, Kensington, London, United Kingdom
|align=left|
|-

|}
Career Record:

References

External links
Harry Scott: A Boxing Pro by Harry Otty

English male boxers
1937 births
2015 deaths
Boxers from Liverpool
Middleweight boxers